Harmony Tan was the defending champion but chose not to participate.

Ana Bogdan won the title, defeating Anna Blinkova in the final, 7–5, 6–3.

Seeds

Draw

Finals

Top half

Bottom half

References

Main Draw

Engie Open Andrézieux-Bouthéon 42 - Singles